Avgustin is a Russian male first name. Its feminine version is Avgustina. The name is derived from the Latin word augustus, which means majestic, sacred. Its colloquial form is Avgust (which can also be a separate, albeit related, name).

The patronymics derived from this first name are "" (Avgustinovich; masculine) and its colloquial form "" (Avgustinych), and " (Avgustinovna; feminine).

Its diminutives include Avgustinka, Avgusta, Gusta,Gustya, Ustya, Gusya, and Tina.

See also
Avguštine
Augustin (name)
Augustine (given name)

References

Notes

Sources
Н. А. Петровский (N. A. Petrovsky). "Словарь русских личных имён" (Dictionary of Russian First Names). ООО Издательство "АСТ". Москва, 2005. 

Russian masculine given names
